Selkirk is an unincorporated community in Wichita County, Kansas, United States.  It is located between Leoti and Tribune.

History
Selkirk had a post office between 1887 and 1980.

References

Further reading

External links
 Wichita County maps: Current, Historic, KDOT

Unincorporated communities in Wichita County, Kansas
Unincorporated communities in Kansas